John Knox Bettersworth was a history professor and author in Mississippi.

James W. Loewen wrote critically of the bigotry and inaccuracy in Betterworth’s high school textbook that was standard in Mississippi schools for decades. Rebecca Miller Davis described Bettersworth’s textbooks as stuck in a Lost Cause mentality.

Writings
Confederate Mississippi:  The People and Policies of a Cotton State in Wartime (1943)
People’s College: A history of Mississippi State (1953)
Mississippi:  A History  (1959)
South of Appomatox  
Mississippi in the Confederacy (1961)
Mississippi the Land and the People (1981)
Your Mississippi (1975)
People’s University: The centennial history of Mississippi State (1980)

Articles
”Mississippi Historiography” (1957)
”Humor in the Old Southwest: Yesterday and Today” Mississippi Historical Quarterly 1964

References

American writers
Year of birth missing (living people)
Living people